The inaugural East Suffolk District Council elections were held on 2 May 2019 to elect all 55 members of the newly formed East Suffolk District Council in England. This was held on the same day as other local council elections across England.

Summary

Election result

|-

Ward results

Aldeburgh & Leiston

Beccles & Worlingham

Bungay & Wainford

Carlford & Fynn Valley

Carlton & Whitton

Carlton Colville

Deben

Eastern Felixstowe

Framlingham

Gunton & St Margarets

Halesworth & Blything

Harbour & Normanston

Kelsale & Yoxford

Kesgrave

Kessingland

Kirkley & Pakefield

Lothingland

Martlesham & Purdis Farm

Melton

Orwell & Villages

Oulton Broad

Rendlesham & Orford

Rushmere St Andrew

Saxmundham

Southwold

Western Felixstowe

Wickham Market

Woodbridge

Wrentham, Wangford & Westleton

By-elections

Beccles and Worlingham

Framlingham

Aldeburgh & Leiston

Orwell & Villages

References

2019 English local elections
2019
May 2019 events in the United Kingdom
2010s in Suffolk